Guntur is a city in the Guntur mandal of the Guntur district of Andhra Pradesh, India.

Guntur may also refer to:
Guntur district, one of the 13 districts in Andhra Pradesh, India
Guntur revenue division, a revenue division in the Guntur district, Andhra Pradesh, India
Guntur East mandal, a mandal in Guntur district, Andhra Pradesh, India
Guntur West mandal, a mandal in Guntur district, Andhra Pradesh, India
Guntur Urban mandal, a former mandal of Guntur district, Andhra Pradesh, India
Mount Guntur, a volcano in Indonesia
Guntur, an administrative village, in Setiabudi, South Jakarta, Indonesia
, a coastal tanker, formerly named Empire Barkis, in service with Shell Company of Singapore Ltd from 1947 to 1962
Guntur Soekarnoputra, son of Indonesian politician Sukarno